Greenwich Leisure Ltd (GLL), operating under the brand "Better", is a non-profit charitable Social Enterprise organisation which runs over 250 sport and leisure facilities and libraries on behalf of local authorities in London and across the UK, as well as its own internal college and the "Healthwise" programme. Its headquarters is in Middlegate House, the 1810-built former storekeeper's mansion at Royal Arsenal, Woolwich, South East London.

History 
GLL was established to run local services in the London Borough of Greenwich in 1993 as a non profit distributing co-operative. In the following years it started to run services for other local authorities. It also manages Crystal Palace National Sports Centre. On 9 January 2012 it was announced that GLL would be managing the Aquatics Centre and the "copper box" Multi-Use Arena of the London 2012 Olympic Games from 2013 for 10 years.

In January 2011 Nexus Community and GLL merged; further mergers, acquisitions and contract awards followed so that by 2016, GLL was a national leisure provider with a presence in England, Wales and Northern Ireland.

In June 2012 GLL rebranded all their centres under the "Better" brand.

Structure 
GLL is a staff-led 'Leisure Trust', social enterprise structured as an Industrial and Provident Society for the benefit of the community. The members of the co-operative and therefore owners of the company are the workers of GLL.

References

Co-operatives in the United Kingdom
Companies based in the Royal Borough of Greenwich
Health clubs in the United Kingdom
Social enterprises
Sports organisations of the United Kingdom